Events from the year 2003 in North Korea.

Incumbents
Premier: Hong Song-nam (until 3 September), Pak Pong-ju (starting 3 September)
Supreme Leader: Kim Jong-il

Events
 2003 North Korean parliamentary election
 2003 North Korean local elections

References

 
North Korea
Years of the 21st century in North Korea
2000s in North Korea
North Korea